Rollingstone may refer to several locations:

 Rollingstone, Queensland, Australia
 Rollingstone, Minnesota, U.S.
 Rollingstone Creek, a stream in Minnesota

See also
 Rolling Stone (disambiguation)